Constituency PP-117 is a constituency of Provincial Assembly of the Punjab  in Punjab, Pakistan.

The previous name of this constituency was PP-99; it was changed for the 2008 elections.

PP-117 Mandi Bahauddin-II
()

Brief introduction
There are eight union councils in the Provincial Assembly Constituency.

The last election of local bodies was held in 1991.

The total number of registered voters was 153,135 now in 2013. In the 2008 elections, the number of registered voters was 134,119.

Main areas
 Phalia Town Committee
 The following Qanungo Halqas of Phalia tehsil:
 Phalia-I)
 Phalia-II)
 Paharianwali
 Jokalian of Mandi Bahauddin district

Elections results 2008
 Registered voters: 134,119
 Polled: 81,562
 Valid votes: 81,605
 Rejected votes: 2,346
 Percentage of votes polled to registered voters: 60.81%

Asif Bashir Bhagat was elected as Member of Provincial Assembly of the Punjab (MPA) in 2008. He belongs to the Pakistan Peoples Party Parliamentarians (PPPP) political party.

Elections results 2013

References

Phalia
PP-117